A village is a type of incorporated urban municipality in the Canadian province of Saskatchewan. A village is created from an organized hamlet by the Minister of Municipal Affairs by ministerial order via section 51 of The Municipalities Act if the community has:
been an organized hamlet for three or more years;
a population of 100 or more;
50 or more dwellings or businesses; and
a taxable assessment base that meets a prescribed minimum.

Saskatchewan has 250 villages that had a cumulative population of 41,514 and an average population of 166 in the 2016 Census. Saskatchewan's largest village is Caronport with a population of 994, while Ernfold, Keeler, Krydor, Valparaiso and Waldron are the province's smallest villages with populations of 15 each.

A village council may request the Minister of Municipal Affairs to change its status to a town if the village has a population of 500 or more.

List

Restructured villages
The following is a list of former villages in Saskatchewan that have been restructured into another municipality, such as a rural municipality, resort village or city.

See also
List of communities in Saskatchewan
List of municipalities in Saskatchewan

References

Villages